The 1997 Campeonato Argentino de Rugby was the 51st annual rugby competition held in Argentina in 1997. Cordoba defeated Rosario in the final game to win the tournament.

The Campeonato Argentino consisted of 21 teams, divided into three divisions, "Campeonato", "Ascenso" and "Promocional".

Rugby Union in Argentina in 1997

National 
 The "Campeonato Argentino Menores de 21" (Under 21 championship) was won by Buenos Aires
 The "Campeonato Argentino Menores de 19" (Under 19 championship) was won by Buenos Aires 
 The "National Championship for clubs" was won by Jockey Club de Rosario
 The "Torneo de la URBA" (Buenos Aires) was won by San Isidro Club
 The "Cordoba Province Championship" was won by La Tablada
 The North-East Championship was won by Universitario de Tucumán

International 
 May–June: The England National Rugby Union team visited Argentina. They played six matches, with two tests. The first test was won by England, the second by the Pumas.

The Pumas went on a tour of New Zealand in June. They lost five out of six matches, with two heavy losses against the All Blacks by the scores of 8-93, and 10-62.

 October–November: The Australian National Rugby Union Team played five matches in Argentina before their tournament in Great Britain. One test match was won by the Wallabies by the score of (23-15),  and one by the Pumas (18-16).

 Argentina won the South American Championship.

"Campeonato" 
The title was decided by a round robin tournament, with the last place finisher relegated to the second division.

"Ascenso"

"Promocional"

Pool A 
The Centro team forfeited and did not participate in the tournament.

Pool B 
The Cuenca del Salado and Oeste teams forfeited and did not participate in the tournament.

Final 

 Alta Valle  was promoted to "ascenso"

External links 
 Memorias de la UAR 1997
  Francesco Volpe, Paolo Pacitti (Author), Rugby 2000, GTE Gruppo Editorale (1999)

Campeonato Argentino de Rugby
Argentina